Slone is a surname. Notable people with the surname include:
Carl Slone (born c. 1937), American basketball coach
Philip Slone (1907–2003), U.S. soccer player
Ricca Slone, Canadian-born American politician
Richard T. Slone (born 1974), English painter
Tara Slone (born 1973), Canadian rock vocalist, actor and TV personality
Verna Mae Slone (1914–2009), American writer
Doctor Slone, a fictional character from the video game Fortnite

See also
Slone Glacier, Antarctica
Słone (disambiguation), various places in Poland
Sloan (disambiguation)
Sloane (disambiguation)